Kardamas is a village and a community in the municipal unit of Amaliada, in Elis, Greece. It is located in the plains near the Ionian Sea, 3 km north of Douneika, 3 km southwest of Amaliada and 14 km northwest of Pyrgos. The community includes the small village Petroules. Kardamas had a train station on the line from Patras to Pyrgos.

Population

People

Panagiotis Adraktas (b. September 28, 1948), politician
Vangelis Baktis (b. November 14, 1985), physicist
Michael Bramos (b. May 27, 1987), basketball player

External links
Kardamas, from the Amaliada municipal website
GTP - Kardamas

See also
List of settlements in Elis

References

Populated places in Elis